Third Watch is an American crime drama television series created by John Wells and Edward Allen Bernero that aired on NBC from September 26, 1999, to May 6, 2005, with a total of 132 episodes spanning over six seasons. It was produced by John Wells Productions, in association with Warner Bros. Television.

The show was set and taped in New York City, and with an ensemble cast of characters, the storylines centered on the lives of police officers of the New York City Police Department (NYPD) and the firefighters and Emergency Medical Services (EMS) of the New York City Fire Department (FDNY), all working the same fictional precinct during the 3 pm to 11 pm shift – the 'third watch'.

After the September 11 attacks hit New York in 2001, season three opened with the episode "In Their Own Words", which aired on October 15, 2001, and featured interviews with real-life NYPD and FDNY members who responded to the attacks. The following episode was titled "September Tenth".

Premise
The series followed the exploits of a group of police officers, firefighters, and paramedics in the fictional NYPD 55th Precinct and the fictional FDNY Squad 55/Ladder 100/Battalion 24 firehouse, whose shifts fell between 3 pm and 11 pm, the "third watch". The precinct and fire station were located on the fictional corner of King Boulevard and Arthur Street; hence the nickname "Camelot". Exterior/interior shots of the 55th Precinct and the firehouse were filmed in Long Island City, Queens, although both in the show appear to be located somewhere between the Bronx, and midtown and Inwood in Manhattan. Third Watch succeeded in presenting all three branches of New York City's emergency services in the same show, reviving a failed attempt to do so nine years prior with the similarly themed H.E.L.P.

The show balanced numerous single-episode events with other, ongoing storylines, some of which spanned multiple seasons. Though it gained much acclaim and eventually won an award for its emotional and honest portrayal of 9/11 and its aftermath, Third Watch was also criticized in some circles for extremely detailed violence, and extensive (by network standards) profane language. The show was created, produced, and written by John Wells and Edward Allen Bernero. The theme song for the show was "Keep Hope Alive" by The Crystal Method, except for the pilot episode, when "Right Here, Right Now" by Fatboy Slim was played during the opening sequence.

In the spring of 2005, NBC decided not to renew Third Watch, making the sixth season its last. The series' finale, "Goodbye to Camelot", aired in the United States on Friday, May 6, 2005. Several major newspapers, including the New York Times and the Bergen Record, have since listed it as a TV show that was cancelled too early.

Conception
John Wells had wanted to do a show about paramedics for some time due to his work on ER, but did not think he had enough material to make such a show. Ed Bernero, a former Chicago cop, had wanted to do a police drama partly based on his own experiences. The two worked together on the short-lived show Trinity and, after that show was cancelled, Wells asked Bernero if he wanted to co-create a show with him.

Originally, the show was only going to be about the police and paramedics, but firefighter Jimmy Doherty was added to the show after Eddie Cibrian auditioned for the role of Bosco. Cibrian lost out to Jason Wiles, but because of the attention he received from women due to his good looks, the producers decided to put him in the show as a new character. Bernero reportedly commented that they did not have any firefighters, and the fire aspect of the show was added.

Episodes

The series consists of six seasons with a total of 132 episodes, produced and broadcast from September 26, 1999, to May 6, 2005.

Crossovers

"Unleashed" — Yokas and Bosco help Dr. Susan Lewis find her drug-addicted sister. The story begins on ER in the episode "Brothers & Sisters".
"In the Family Way" — An AWOL soldier  arrested for a jewelry-store robbery that left a friend of Sully's dead contracts a virus that begins to spread. The story concludes on Medical Investigation in the episode "Half-Life".

Main cast

Third Watch's original ensemble cast in the series' first season consisted of Michael Beach, Coby Bell, Bobby Cannavale, Eddie Cibrian, Molly Price, Kim Raver, Anthony Ruivivar, Skipp Sudduth, and Jason Wiles.

Eddie Cibrian also portrayed the contract-role of Cole on Sunset Beach while appearing on Third Watch at the same time until Sunset Beach'''s cancellation in January 2000.

In 2000, Amy Carlson was added to the cast as paramedic/firefighter Alex Taylor. In 2001, series regular Bobby Cannavale willingly left the series after he asked to be written out due to lack of character use and development.

At the start of season three, Chris Bauer was added to the main credits as Fred Yokas after being a recurring guest star previously. Tia Texada became a recurring guest star, and later, a full cast member, in 2002. Carlson left the show in 2003. Later that year, Nia Long was introduced as Officer Sasha Monroe (her rank was changed in season six in one of the show's most shocking plot twists). Yvonne Jung became a recurring guest star also in 2003, although she had been a guest in season-three episode "Act Brave" as a lawyer defending Kim in her custody battle with Jimmy. Also in 2003, Bonnie Dennison was added as Emily Yokas, previously being recurring.

In 2004, just after celebrating the show's 100th episode, Eddie Cibrian and Michael Beach left the show. Cibrian's departure marked the first time a main character was written out of the show without dying. Series regular Molly Price's character, Faith Yokas, made very few appearances in season five of the series because Price was pregnant throughout much of the season. The writers for Third Watch explained her absence by her character being seriously injured in a shootout, and then trying to recuperate at home. In the few scenes Price was in, her growing belly was frequently hidden by blankets piled on top of her while she lay in bed. Cara Buono joined the cast as Paramedic Grace Foster late in the show's fifth season in 2004.

Kim Raver decided to leave the show after the show's sixth-season opener and became a series regular on 24. Josh Stewart was introduced as a main cast member of season six as Probationary Officer Brendan Finney. After a several-month absence, Dennison reclaimed the role of Emily Yokas for the rest of the final season, while Chris Bauer left the show to pursue his new show Tilt, which coincidentally co-starred his former Third Watch castmate, Eddie Cibrian, but made sporadic guest-star appearances in season six. Beach, Cibrian, and Raver rejoined their former co-stars in the series finale, "Goodbye To Camelot".

Main cast

1 The Yokas' oldest child Emily was portrayed by P.J. Morrison in seasons one-three in a recurring role. Dennison took over the role in season four and received star billing in the final two seasons in the episodes in which she appeared.

Recurring cast
These cast members are listed by the season in which they were introduced:

Main crew

Directors
Guy Norman Bee 
Peter Ellis   (5 episodes, 2002–2003)
Jesús Salvador Treviño   (4 episodes, 2001–2002)
Vincent Misiano 
Christopher Chulack   (3 episodes, 1999–2004)
Charles Haid   (3 episodes, 2000–2005)
Félix Enríquez Alcalá   (3 episodes, 2003–2005)
Gloria Muzio   (3 episodes, 2003–2005)
Skipp Sudduth   (3 episodes, 2003–2005)
Edward Allen Bernero   (3 episodes, 2004–2005)
Nelson McCormick   (3 episodes, 2004–2005)
Chris Misiano   (2 episodes, 1999–2000)
Bryan Spicer   (2 episodes, 1999–2000)
R.W. Goodwin   (2 episodes, 1999)
Jace Alexander   (2 episodes, 2000–2001)
Nick Gomez   (2 episodes, 2000–2001)
Michael Fields   (2 episodes, 2000)
Julie Hébert 
Stephen Cragg   (2 episodes, 2004–2005)
John E. Gallagher   (2 episodes, 2004–2005)
Paul Michael Glaser   (2 episodes, 2004–2005)
Rosemary Rodriguez 
Matt Earl Beesley   (2 episodes, 2004)
Brooke Kennedy 

Writers
Edward Allen Bernero   (132 episodes, 1999–2005)
John Wells   (132 episodes, 1999–2005)
Janine Sherman   (13 episodes, 2000–2005)
Scott Williams   (11 episodes, 2001–2004)
John Ridley   (6 episodes, 1999–2001)
Charles Murray   (5 episodes, 2003–2005)
Lance Gentile   (4 episodes, 1999–2000)
Bonnie Mark   (4 episodes, 2000–2001)
Angela Amato   (4 episodes, 2003–2005)
Terri Kopp   (3 episodes, 1999–2000)
John Romano   (3 episodes, 1999–2000)
Julie Hébert   (2 episodes, 2000–2001)
Kyra Keene   (2 episodes, 2000–2001)
Victor De Jesus   (2 episodes, 2004)
Siobhan Byrne   (unknown episodes)
Paul Golding   (unknown episodes)
Brooke Kennedy   (unknown episodes)
Jorge Zamacona

Broadcast and ratings information
All six seasons of Third Watch were originally broadcast on NBC in the United States and simulcast in Canada on CTV .Third Watch was also broadcast worldwide including Africa, Europe, Latin America, Asia, Oceania and the Middle East.

Home media
Warner Home Video released Season 1 of Third Watch on DVD in Regions 1, 2 and 4.  Season 2 was released in Region 1 on July 7, 2009. 

Music licensing issues delayed the release of the first two seasons and, as of 2021, it is unknown when or if the remaining four seasons will ever be released. However, some post-broadcast releases include episodes slightly modified, with music different from the original broadcast.  In March 2015, Crave TV began streaming the first three seasons. However, as of 2021, Crave TV no longer offers this streaming option.

In December 2021, The Roku Channel added all 6 seasons of Third Watch to watch for free. In December of 2022 Roku stopped offering Third Watch for streaming.

In February 2023, Tubi added all 6 seasons of Third Watch to watch for free.  However, some users will not be able to access it depending on which country their IPN identifies as their location (it isn't available in all countries).  It is noticeable in this release that several of the songs used in the show have been changed to overcome the initial musical licensing issues.

Reception
The hit series won the prestigious Peabody Award for Season 3 episode "In Their Own Words", in which series regulars Michael Beach, Coby Bell, Amy Carlson, Eddie Cibrian, Kim Raver, Anthony Ruivivar, Skipp Sudduth, and Jason Wiles introduced clips of interviews with the real-life NYPD and FDNY members who responded to the September 11 attacks on the World Trade Center. Series regular Molly Price was interviewed in a segment because she is married to real-life FDNY firefighter and Third Watch recurring guest star Derek Kelly.

Many Third Watch former cast members were nominated for awards for their work on the show. Among them, both Bobby Cannavale and Anthony Ruivivar were nominated for ALMA Awards for their positive portrayals of Latino characters.  Nia Long also won several NAACP Image Awards for her portrayal of the African-American character Sasha Monroe.  Other cast members, including Michael Beach, Molly Price, and Tia Texada also were nominated for various awards.  The show itself was nominated for several Primetime Emmy Awards including Outstanding Stunt Coordination and Outstanding Sound Editing for a Series, which it won in 2000.

See also

 Rescue Me,  2004–2011 American television series about NYC firefighters
 Firehouse'', 1974 American television series about LA firefighters

References

External links

 
 

1990s American crime drama television series
1990s American medical television series
1990s American police procedural television series
1999 American television series debuts
2000s American crime drama television series
2000s American medical television series
2000s American police procedural television series
2005 American television series endings
American action television series
English-language television shows
Fictional portrayals of the New York City Police Department
NBC original programming
Peabody Award-winning television programs
Television series about firefighting
Television series by Warner Bros. Television Studios
Television shows set in New York City
Television shows filmed in New York City
Television series created by Edward Allen Bernero